Marko Jelić (born 15 March 1976) is a Croatian politician and university professor who is serving as prefect of Šibenik-Knin County since 2021. He previously served as Mayor of Knin from 2017 to 2021.

Early life and education 
Born in Knin in 1976, Jelić finished elementary school and the first two grades of high school in his native town, while in 1994 he completed the final two grades at the Juraj Baraković High School in Zadar. In 2000 he graduated in Molecular Biology at the Faculty of Science of the University of Zagreb, earning the title of Bachelor of Science. 

In 2003 he received his PhD in Molecular Biology and Biochemistry from the University of Kiel and Ludwig Maximilian University of Munich.

Career 
Jelić started his career in 2004 as a senior associate for new technologies at the Center for Entrepreneurship of the City of Knin.

In 2005 he was appointed interim and in October 2007 permanent dean of the Marko Marulić Polytechnic in Knin. He held that position for four years, in parallel with the president of the Council of Polytechnics and Higher Education Institutions of the Republic of Croatia.

In 2012 he was appointed director for Management and Development of Matica d.o.o. in Knin and the year before he became the head of the Innovation Center and vice dean for development, scientific and professional cooperation at the Marko Marulić Polytechnic in Knin.

From 2015 to 2016 he was the acting dean of the ASPIRA College of Management and Design in Split, and since 2005 he has been a full teacher of Biology, Biochemistry, Plant Physiology, Environmental Protection and Hunting at the Marko Marulić Polytechnic in Knin.

Political career 
In the 2017 local elections as a member of his own independent list (Dr. Marko Jelić's Independent List), Jelić defeated his opponent and former HDZ mayor of Knin, Josipa Rimac, in the runoff.

On 20 March 2021, Jelić confirmed his candidacy for prefect of Šibenik-Knin County in the 2021 local elections which will be held on 16 May. His candidacy was supported by all independent mayors in the county, as well as by Independent List Stipe Petrina, whose member, Iris Ukić Kotarac, was selected as the candidate for deputy prefect. On 16 May, Jelić won the first round of elections, winning 36.52% and thus securing a place in the runoff against the incumbent prefect, Goran Pauk of the HDZ.

As well Jelić won by a slim margin of 187 votes over incumbent prefect and advanced to the runoff, the candidate list of the group of voters gathered around Jelić won six seats in the county assembly. In the second round held two weeks later, he was elected Prefect of Šibenik-Knin County, winning 25,458 votes against Pauk's 16,366, making him the first non-partisan prefect of the county and the first prefect of the county not elected from the Croatian Democratic Union (HDZ).

He officially took over the duties of prefect on 4 June 2021.

References

External links 
Official website 
dr. sc. Marko Jelić at Grad Knin 
Marko Jelić at Gradonačelnik.hr  

1975 births
Living people
Independent politicians in Croatia
Mayors of Knin